The Søo or Søa is a river in the municipality of Heim in Trøndelag county, Norway. It then flows into Lake Vassli (Vasslivatnet), which sits at roughly the same elevation, depending on levels behind the dam.

Its course flows from Lake Vassli through the Søo Valley (Søvassdalen) parallel to European route E39 highway. Norwegian County Road 680 follows the river northwards as flows into Lake Ro (Rovatnet).

See also
List of rivers in Norway

References

Rivers of Trøndelag
Heim, Norway
Rivers of Norway